Doniphan Hollow is a valley in Oregon County in the U.S. state of Missouri.

Doniphan Hollow was so named on account of a local road which led to Doniphan, Missouri.

References

Valleys of Oregon County, Missouri
Valleys of Missouri